Wiren is a 2018 Surinamese drama film directed by Ivan Tai-Apin. It was selected as the Surinamese entry for the Best International Feature Film at the 93rd Academy Awards, but it was not nominated. It was the first time Suriname had made a submission in the category.

Plot
A deaf boy fights against discrimination in Suriname.

Cast
 Rafe Leysner as young Wiren
 Altaafkhan Dhonre as teenage Wiren
 Idi Lemmers as adult Wiren
 Gaby Treurniet as Lily
 Helianthe Redan as Miss Landbrug
 Erwin Emanuels as Lily's Father
 Consuelo Denz as Lawyer Franscisca
 Anthony Frazier as Doctor Young

See also
 List of submissions to the 93rd Academy Awards for Best International Feature Film
 List of Surinamese submissions for the Academy Award for Best International Feature Film

References

External links
 

2018 films
2018 drama films
Surinamese drama films
2010s Dutch-language films
Films about deaf people